A. G. Mehta was a Ugandan member of parliament, barrister and the eldest son of a prominent Indian industrialist. The Honourable A.G. Mehta was elected as the first Asian-Indian mayor of Uganda's capital Kampala in 1968 and was a close colleague of Uganda's first prime minister Milton Obote; with whom he jointly fought for the country's independence at the Uganda Constitutional Conference in 1961. He is credited with drafting elements of what would become the first Constitution of Uganda.

Education 
A.G. Mehta was educated as a barrister at Queen Mary University of London, School of Law, in West London, and was legally permitted to practice law in the United Kingdom, Uganda and Kenya.

Political career

Member of Parliament 
As an member of parliament, A.G. Mehta attended the Uganda Constitutional Conference at Lancaster House in 1961 as part of the Uganda Peoples’ Congress (UPC) delegation alongside Milton Obote. The conference was also attended by then Governor of Uganda, Sir Frederick Crawford, and the Secretary of State for the Colonies, Iain Macleod. Recommendations produced by Mehta and other conference attendees resulted in the first Ugandan Constitution, which took effect on 9 October 1962.

Mayor of Kampala 
A.G. Mehta was elected as the first Indian mayor of Uganda's capitol city, Kampala, in 1968. One week before his untimely death in 1969, Mehta opened the first exhibition on the Baháʼí Faith in the National Theatre of Uganda, where his opening address, attended by numerous East-African dignitaries, advocated pointedly for the unity of mankind.

Family 
A. G. Mehta was born the eldest son of the Mehta family, one of Kampala's longest-standing and most prominent Indian families originally hailing from Porbandar, Gujarat, India. The Mehta family were amongst the first multi-millionaires in East Africa with numerous agricultural businesses including the production of cotton and coffee.

Following his death in 1969, Mehta's widow and five surviving children were exiled from Uganda by his former colleague, Idi Amin.

Mehta's granddaughter is Maya Asha McDonald, a British art historian and journalist known best for her 2022 op-ed on Russian President Vladimir Putin.

Publications and institutions 
A.G. Mehta's role in establishing the first Constitution of Uganda in 1962 is recorded in Ali AlʼAmin Mazrui's 1978 book Political Values and the Educated Class in Africa published by the University of California Press.

Images of Mehta's political career can be found in the British Library and were digitised by the Endangered Archives Programme.

References 

1969 deaths
Mayors of Kampala
Ugandan people of Indian descent
Alumni of Queen Mary University of London
20th-century Ugandan politicians
Uganda People's Congress politicians
Members of the Parliament of Uganda
20th-century Ugandan lawyers
1927 births